Offset ink is a specific type of ink used in conjunction with offset printing presses, such as those used to produce letterpress or lithography prints. Such ink must be specially formulated to resist other chemicals it will come in contact with on the printing press. It is crucial that offset ink resist water-in-ink emulsification (e.g. repel rather than absorb water). It also should withstand degradation by the fountain solution that covers the non-printing areas of the engraved plate.

Offset ink needs to be very rich in pigment so that its full color vibrancy is perceptible, even in minute quantity.

References

 Ainsworth, Mitchell, C., "Inks and Their Composition and Manufacture," Charles Griffin and Company Ltd, 1904.

Inks
Printing materials
Visual arts materials